Orestilla is a genus of bristle flies in the family Tachinidae. There is at least one described species in Orestilla, O. primoris.

Distribution
United States.

References

Dexiinae
Diptera of North America
Tachinidae genera
Monotypic Brachycera genera